Kobi Yakob Arad (Hebrew: קובי ארד‎; born: October 2, 1981) is an Israeli-born American jazz pianist, composer, and music producer. He is known for being the pianist, vocalist, and bandleader of the Kobi Arad Band. He has won a Hollywood Music in Media (HMMA) Award and an Independent Music Award, both for his work as a solo artist and as part of the Kobi Arad Band. 

He has collaborated with artists such as Stevie Wonder, Cindy and Carlos Santana, Jack DeJohnette, and Roy Ayers.

Early life and education 
Arad was born on October 2, 1981 and raised in Haifa, Israel. He earned his bachelor's degree at Tel Aviv University and became the first musician to earn a doctorate in contemporary improvisation and third stream from the New England Conservatory of Music.

Career 

While living in Israel, Arad participated as a keyboardist in a trio with Asaf Sirkis and Gabriel Mayer in the 1990s. Arad also collaborated with Stevie Wonder and his manager Stephanie Andrews at the Berklee Performance Center in 2005.

Arad released his album Sparks of Understanding in 2009, which featured an appearance from drummer Bob Moses.

Arad collaborated with recording engineer Robert Margouleff on The Experience Project in 2015. In 2015, he also released the albums Webern Re-Visioned, which consisted of re-imaginings of works by Anton Webern, and Superflow, which is a collaboration with Roy Ayers, featuring bassist Jonathan Levy.

He also recorded Ellington Upside Down, a Duke Ellington tribute CD, with the Kobi Arad Band. The album’s mashup of “Take the ‘A’ Train” and “It Ain’t Mean a Thing” was nominated for Best Jazz Instrumental at the 17th Independent Music Awards (2019). Arad’s album Segments went on to win Best Jazz Instrumental in the album category at the same event. 

At the 2021  Hollywood Music in Media (HMMA) Awards, Arad won the Independent Music Artist award in Best Jazz for his performance of “Bemsha Swing” by Thelonious Monk.

Discography (selected)

Albums 

 Sparks of Understanding (2009)
 Ancient Novice (2009)
 Inner Hymns (2012)
 The Experience Project (2015)
 Webern Re-Visioned (2015)
 Superflow (2015)
 Cubism - Hyper-Dimensional Jazz (2016)
 Flux - A Song Cycle for Solo Fender Rhodes (2017)
 Ellington Upside Down (2017)
 Segments (2018)
 Intonations (2019)
 Sketches of Monk (2020)

References 

1981 births
Living people
American jazz pianists
American people of Israeli descent
Jewish American musicians
Jewish jazz musicians
Jazz arrangers
Jazz bandleaders
American jazz composers
American jazz keyboardists
Israeli jazz pianists
Israeli Jews